Abuelita is a chocolate tablet, syrup, or powdered mix in individual packets, made by Nestlé and used to make Mexican-style hot chocolate, also known as chocolate para mesa (English: "table chocolate"). It was originally invented and commercialized in Mexico in 1939, by Fábrica de Chocolates La Azteca. The name is an affectionate Spanish word for "grandma" (literally translated as "little grandmother" or "granny"). Since 1973, Mexican actress Sara García has been the image for the brand before the Swiss company acquired it in the 1990s.

Overview 
The chocolate usually comes in round tablets that can be split into 1/8 or 1/4-disc wedges and melted into the milk. The product ingredients (in order of percentage): sugar, chocolate processed with alkali, soy lecithin, vegetable oils (palm, shea nut and/or illipe nut), artificial cinnamon flavor, PGPR (an emulsifier). Abuelita has been a  Mexican staple product for more than 60 years, and can be identified by its unique taste and packaging.

One suggested method for preparing Abuelita is to bring a saucepan of milk (not water) to a boil, add the tablet of chocolate and stir continuously with a whisk or molinillo (a whisk-like wooden stirring spoon native to Meso America) until melted and bubbly or creamy. The drink is served hot or chilled to mix with alcoholic beverages.

Abuelita is often prepared for special occasions, such as Day of the Dead (a holiday in which people remember their family and friends whose spirits departed to the afterlife) and Las Posadas (Christmas season).

See also

Champurrado, Mexican hot chocolate 
List of chocolate drinks
Ibarra (chocolate)

References

External links
 

1939 establishments in Mexico
Products introduced in 1939
Brand name chocolate
Food and drink companies of Mexico
Nestlé brands
Mexican chocolate